Ludwigia is the generic name of three groups of organisms. It can refer to:

 Ludwigia (ammonite)
 Ludwigia (beetle)
 Ludwigia (plant)